Ellis Island is a former immigrant processing station in New York Harbor.

Ellis Island may also refer to:

Film
 Ellis Island (miniseries), 1984 British miniseries
 Ellis Island (1936 film), a 1936 American crime film

Music
 Ellis Island: The Dream of America, a 2002 work for actors and orchestra by American composer Peter Boyer
 Ellis Island, a 2001 album by The Irish Tenors 
 Ellis Island Sound, instrumental band from London, England
 Ellis Island, a 2015 song by The Corrs (White Light album)

Novels
 Ellis Island (novel), 1983 historical novel by Fred Mustard Stewart

Places
 Ellis Island (Missouri), an island in the Mississippi River, United States
 Ellis Island (Queensland), part of the Great Barrier Reef Marine Park, Australia
 Ellis Island Immigrant Hospital
 Ellis Island Casino & Brewery, an entertainment venue in Paradise, Nevada

See also 
 List of Ellis Island immigrants, notables only.
 Ellis Island Medal of Honor, American award which pays homage to the immigrant experience 
 Tuvalu, formerly known as the Ellice Islands